Higor de Sales Coimbra (born 7 August 1987) is a Brazilian footballer who last played as striker for the Fortuna Liga club 1. FC Tatran Prešov, on loan from Sigma Olomouc.

Biography
Born in Brasília, Higor spent his early career in Federal District clubs. After he was released by Brasiliense in mid-2008, he joined São Paulo state club Rio Preto. He did not score any goal in the state league second division. He only able to play the first 5 games in the league as a defender. In July 2009 he left for Czech club SK Hlavice. He crossed the border to Slovakia in January 2010.

He came to FC Spartak Trnava in summer 2010. In 2011, he joined Sigma Olomouc. In September, he left for Tatran Prešov.

References

1987 births
Living people
Brazilian footballers
FC Spartak Trnava players
1. FC Tatran Prešov players
MFK Ružomberok players
Slovak Super Liga players
Expatriate footballers in Slovakia
SK Sigma Olomouc players
Expatriate footballers in the Czech Republic
Brazilian expatriate sportspeople in Slovakia
Brazilian expatriate sportspeople in the Czech Republic
Association football forwards
Footballers from Brasília